"The Goose that Laid the Golden Eggs" is one of the best known Aesop's Fables

Golden Egg or Golden Eggs may also refer to:

Fictional entities
 A golden egg, the main object of the Russian folk tale "Kurochka Ryaba" ("Ryaba the Hen")

Games
 Golden Eggs, an hidden item that unlocks a bonus levels in Angry Birds
 Golden egg, a microtransaction in the Wii U game Devil's Third by Nintendo

Literature
 The Golden Egg (1984), a novel by  Dutch author Tim Krabbé
 The Golden Egg (2013), the 22nd book in Donna Leon's Commissario Guido Brunetti series of crime novels

Music
 Golden Eggs, a bootleg album by the 1960s English group The Yardbirds
 "The Golden Egg", a song by the American indie band Quasi, from the album Field Studies (1999)

Film
 Golden Eggs, a 1941 Donald Duck cartoon

Television
 "The Golden Eggs", a 1963 episode of the British spy-fi television series The Avengers
 The World of Golden Eggs, a 2005 Japanese anime television series

Sports
 Golden egg, the trophy in the Egg Bowl also known as the "Battle for the Goden Egg"